Yordan Varbanov (born 15 February 1980) is a Bulgarian former footballer who played as a defender and currently assistant manager at Vitosha Bistritsa.

Varbanov previously played for CSKA Sofia and Lokomotiv Sofia in the Bulgarian A PFG.

Honours
CSKA Sofia
 Bulgarian League (2): 2002–03, 2004–05

References

External links

1980 births
Living people
People from Kazanlak
Bulgarian footballers
Bulgarian expatriate footballers
PFC Nesebar players
PFC CSKA Sofia players
PFC Spartak Varna players
FC Lokomotiv 1929 Sofia players
Zhejiang Professional F.C. players
Anhui Jiufang players
FC Vitosha Bistritsa players
Expatriate footballers in China
Bulgarian expatriate sportspeople in China
First Professional Football League (Bulgaria) players
Second Professional Football League (Bulgaria) players
Chinese Super League players
Association football defenders